Kurt Dittrich (born 29 January 1958) is an Austrian swimmer. He competed in the men's 100 metre butterfly at the 1980 Summer Olympics.

References

External links
 

1958 births
Living people
Olympic swimmers of Austria
Swimmers at the 1980 Summer Olympics
Swimmers from Vienna
Austrian male butterfly swimmers